The Henry Blood House is a historic house in Kaysville, Utah, United States, that is listed on the National Register of Historic Places (NRHP).

Description
It was the home of Henry H. Blood, who was governor of Utah from 1933 until 1940. The house was designed and built by self-trained architect William Allen.  It was built in c.1896 with Queen Anne stylings and includes an octagonal tower, at about the time of Blood's marriage to Minnie A. Barnes, in June 1896.

It was listed on the National Register of Historic Places April 29, 1980.

See also

 National Register of Historic Places listings in Davis County, Utah

References

External links

Houses on the National Register of Historic Places in Utah
Queen Anne architecture in Utah
Houses completed in 1896
Houses in Davis County, Utah
National Register of Historic Places in Davis County, Utah